Victor Crist (born June 21, 1957) is a former member of the Florida Senate, representing the 12th District from 2000 to 2010. He served in the Florida House of Representatives,  representing the 60th District from 1992 to 2000. Elected as a Republican in districts where the majority of the voters were registered Democrats. Crist served on the Hillsborough County Board of County Commissioners, representing the 2nd District from 2010 to 2018.

In the Senate, Crist served as Chair of the Senate's Criminal and Civil Justice Appropriations Committee and as Vice Chair of the Senate's Health Policy Committee. Crist, has served as an advisor on justice issues to Florida's Attorneys General and Governors.

He started Metropolitan Communications, Inc., in 1983 while still an undergraduate student working through college. In the mid-1990s, Crist founded the University Area Community Development Corporation in one of Tampa's more vulnerable communities. Crist served as Chairman of the board and CEO of the organization for its first 16 years.

References

External links
Web site "Senator Crist's web site"
Formative years "Interview recorded in Oral Histories at USF"
Florida State Legislature - Senator Victor Crist official government website
Project Vote Smart - Senator Victor D. Crist (FL) profile
 
Follow the Money - Victor D Crist
2006 2004 2002 2000 1998 campaign contributions

3.   Florida Clerk’s Manual, House of Representatives and The Senate 1992 – 1994, p. 71,72.

Republican Party Florida state senators
Republican Party members of the Florida House of Representatives
1957 births
Living people
University of South Florida alumni